Günter Pfitzmann (8 April 1924 – 30 May 2003) was a German film actor who appeared in more than 60 films between 1950 and 2001. He was born and died in Berlin, Germany.

Selected filmography

 Only One Night (1950)
 All Clues Lead to Berlin (1952)
 Emil and the Detectives (1954)
 The Captain and His Hero (1955), as Hauptmann Roeder
 Sergeant Borck (1955), as Wachtmeister Heinz Ohlsen
 Your Life Guards (1955), as Charly 
 Siebenmal in der Woche (1957), as Policeman
 Heart Without Mercy (1958), as Dr. Knoll
 Doctor Crippen Lives (1958), as Kriminalassistent Pierre
 Taiga (1958), as Dickmann
 I'll Carry You in My Arms (1958), as Georg
 Nick Knatterton’s Adventure (1959), as Max
 Stalingrad: Dogs, Do You Want to Live Forever? (1959), as Kunowski
 Die Brücke (1959), as Unteroffizier Heilmann
 Abschied von den Wolken (1959), as Howard Sims
 Triplets on Board (1959), as Mac
 Darkness Fell on Gotenhafen (1960), as Oberleutnant Dankel
 Am grünen Strand der Spree (1960, TV miniseries), as Bob Arnoldis
  (1960), as Werner
  (1960), as Frank Mossdorf
 The Miracle of Father Malachia (1961), as Rudolf Reuschel
 Auf Wiedersehen (1961), as Willi Kuhlke
 Gestatten, mein Name ist Cox (1961–1965; leading role in TV series), as Paul Cox
 The Phone Rings Every Night (1962), as Robert Bullinger
 The Squeaker (1963), as Frankie Sutton
 Wilhelmina (1968; leading role in TV miniseries), as Georg
 Das Kriminalmuseum: Die Postanweisung (1968, TV series episode), as Kommissar Marquardt
 Die Unverbesserlichen (1970–1971; TV series), as Jürgen Hechler
 The Captain (1971), as Oldenburg
  (1973; leading role in TV series), as Herr Linderode
 PS (1975; leading role in TV series), as Jochen Neubert
  (1976), as Prangel
 Sladek oder Die schwarze Armee (1976, TV film), as Knorke
 Tatort:  (1977; TV series), as K. F. Kastrup
 Drei Damen vom Grill (1977–1986; leading role in TV series), as Otto Krüger
  (1978, TV series), as Mr. Kalubrigkeit
  (1980), as Consul Meier
 Berliner Weiße mit Schuß (1984–1995; leading role in TV series)
 Praxis Bülowbogen (1987–1996; leading role in TV series), as Dr. Peter Brockmann
 Der Millionenerbe (1990–1993; leading role in TV series), as Johannes Redlich
 Der Havelkaiser (1994–2000; leading role in TV series), as Richard Kaiser
 Letzte Chance für Harry (1998; TV film), as Simon Spradow
 Das Traumschiff: Bali (1999; TV series), as Alfred Sander
 Die Meute der Erben (2001; TV film), as Arno Adelmann
 In aller Freundschaft (2002; TV series, one episode), as Theo Köckritz

References

External links

1924 births
2003 deaths
Burials in Germany
German male film actors
German male television actors
20th-century German male actors
21st-century German male actors
Male actors from Berlin
Burials at the Waldfriedhof Zehlendorf